Knockananna is a village in County Wicklow, Ireland.

Knockananna lies close to the border between County Wicklow and County Carlow. The village is the centre of a dispersed farming area, 2km to the north-west of Moyne and the Wicklow Way. There is a grocery shop and a pub in the village. The village has a GAA team and the club colours are red and white.

Colonel Commandant Tom Kehoe (Free State Forces) was born in the area in 1899. He was a member of Michael Collins's assassination Squad, which killed a number of British agents on 21 November 1920. Kehoe himself died from severe wounds he received while attempting to remove a booby trapped land mine during the civil war in Macroom in September 1922.

References

External links
 Knockananna GAA information at the Wicklow GAA website
https://www.customhousecommemoration.com/2017/05/13/tom-kehoe-keogh/
http://photopol.com/knockananna/knockananna.html

Towns and villages in County Wicklow